George Frideric Handel (23 February 1685 – 14 April 1759) wrote his will over a number of years and with a number of codicils. Handel created the first version of his will with nine years to live, and completed his will (with the final codicil) three days before his death. Handel's will begins with the following text:

Parts of the will
The following table documents the dates of the original will and the four codicils, as well as the witness statements at the conclusion of each part of the will.

Handel's will
The contents of each part of Handel's will are detailed in the following table. Note that where quotes have been supplied from the will, the original spelling, punctuation and capitalisations have been reproduced. The Item column gives the precise ordering of each bequest in Handel's will.

Handel's funeral
In the final codicil to his will (item 39 in the above table), Handel expressed a desire to be buried in the following manner:

Handel was buried in the south wing of Westminster Abbey, and his funeral took place on Friday 20 April 1759. The funeral service was performed by Dr. Zachary Pearce (Bishop of Rochester), and took place in the presence of more than 3,000 visitors. The choirs of the Chapel Royal, St. Paul's Cathedral, and Westminster Abbey sang the Funeral Anthem of William Croft.

See also
George Frideric Handel
Letters and writings of George Frideric Handel

References

George Frideric Handel
Handel

es:Testamento de Georg Friedrich Händel#top